X-mount may refer to:

 Fujica X-mount, a bayonet lens mount used on manual-focus Fujica 35mm film SLR cameras in the 1970s and 1980s
 Fujifilm X-mount, a fully electronic bayonet lens mount used on Fujifilm mirrorless APS-C digital cameras and XF lenses since 2012

See also
 Samsung NX-mount

Lens mounts